Rami Eskelinen (born 14 August 1967 in Helsinki), is a Finnish jazz drummer who is probably best known as a member of Trio Töykeät, a Finnish jazz trio. He is also the drummer of Espoo Big Band, and actively teaches music in Espoo-based Pop/Jazz-school Ebeli. He played for Erja Lyytinen until 2010.

External links
Homepage af finnish Blueslady Erja Lyytinen
Homepage of Trio Töykeät
Homepage of Espoon Big Band

1967 births
Living people
Musicians from Helsinki
Finnish jazz drummers
Trio Töykeät members